Cășăria River may refer to:

Cășăria, a tributary of the Azuga in Prahova County, Romania
Cășăria, a tributary of the Tărcuța in Neamț County, Romania

See also 
 Cășăria, a village in Neamț County, Romania
 Valea Cășăriei River (disambiguation)
 Cașin River (disambiguation)